Ashes may refer to:

Ash, the solid remnants of fires.

Media and entertainment

Art 
 Ashes (Munch), an 1894 painting by Edvard Munch

Film 
 The Ashes (film), a 1965 Polish film by director Andrzej Wajda
 Ashes (1922 film), an American silent film 
 Ashes, a 2010 film by director Ajay Naidu
 Ashes (2012 film), a British thriller
 Ashes (1916), American short silent film directed by Robert F. Hill and John McDermott

Literature
 Ashes, a 1904 novel by Polish writer Stefan Żeromski
 Ashes, a 1904 novel by Italian writer Grazia Deledda
 Ashes, a 2003 novel by Japanese writer Kenzo Kitakata
 Ashes: Poems New & Old, a 1979 book by Philip Levine
 "Ashes", a 1924 short story by C. M. Eddy, Jr.
 Ashes, book 1 of the ASHES trilogy by Ilsa J. Bick
 Ashes, a thirty-five volume series of novels by William W. Johnstone

Theatre
 Ashes (play), a play by David Rudkin

Television
A series of television competitions in the Gladiators franchise between Australia and the UK:
Gladiators: The Ashes 1, 1995
Gladiators: The Ashes 2, 1996

Music

Albums
 Ashes (Illenium album), 2016
 Ashes (Kyla La Grange album), 2012
 Ashes (Tristania album), 2005
 Ashes (EP), by Mia Fieldes, or the title song, 2015
 Ashes, by Christian Death, 1985
 Ashes, by the Prophecy, 2003
 Ashes, by Two Steps From Hell, 2008

Songs
 "Ashes" (Celine Dion song), 2018
 "Ashes" (Embrace song), 2004
 "Ashes", by Black Tide from Post Mortem, 2011
 "Ashes", by Chelsea Grin from Ashes to Ashes, 2014
 "Ashes", by Five Finger Death Punch from The Way of the Fist, 2007
 "Ashes", by Ghost from Prequelle, 2018
 "Ashes", by Grand Magus from Wolf's Return, 2005
 "Ashes", by KT Tunstall from KT Tunstall's Acoustic Extravaganza, 2006
 "Ashes", by Meghan Trainor from Treat Myself, 2020
 "Ashes", by Pain of Salvation from The Perfect Element, Part I, 2000
 "Ashes", by Screamin' Jay Hawkins, 1962
 "Ashes", by Trivium from Ember to Inferno, 2003

Sport 
 The Ashes, the Test cricket series between England and Australia
 The Ashes (rugby league), the rugby league Test series between Great Britain and Australia
 The Women's Ashes, the women's cricket series between England and Australia
Soccer Ashes, soccer series held between Australia and New Zealand between the 1920s and 1950s

See also
 Ash (disambiguation)
 Ashe (disambiguation)
 Four Ashes (disambiguation)
 Ashes to Ashes (disambiguation)
 Ashes, Ashes (1943 novel) science fiction novel by René Barjavel
 Ashes Ashes, 2002 album by Leiahdorus